Tworki is a district of Warsaw.

Tworki may also refer to the following villages:
Tworki, Podlaskie Voivodeship (north-east Poland)
Tworki, Grójec County in Masovian Voivodeship (east-central Poland)
Tworki, Siedlce County in Masovian Voivodeship (east-central Poland)